Giuliani Time is a 2005 documentary film by Kevin Keating about Rudy Giuliani, former mayor of New York City. Giuliani Time is distributed by Cinema Libre Studio. A special election version of the film was released on May 2, 2008.

Title 
The documentary's title is a reference to a phrase that police officers allegedly uttered to Abner Louima when they tortured him in a Brooklyn police precinct house.  Louima himself later recanted that statement, saying he had made it up. The phrase was also used by John Shaft in the 2000 remake of Shaft.

Reception 
The Village Voice called the documentary "an incisive portrait of power seizure and class combat as it was performed, by the numbers, on the municipal level."  The film contains several archival segments, as well as interviews with Village Voice writer and unauthorized Giuliani biographer, Wayne Barrett and radio journalist Doug Henwood.

Giuliani Time has a rating of 85% positive at Rotten Tomatoes (22 fresh, 4 rotten).

Awards 
Silver Lake Film Festival, Best Documentary, 2006

Featured New York City personalities
Source:
Wayne Barrett, journalist
Pete King, U.S. Congressman
Gerald Lefcourt, lawyer
Arthur Helton, Iraq War victim
David Dinkins, former New York City mayor (1990–1993)
Norman Siegel, lawyer
Ed Koch, former New York City mayor (1978–1989)
William Bratton, twice former NYPD police commissioner
Rudy Crew, education administrator
Ruth Messinger, politician
Al Sharpton, civil rights activist
Donald Trump, real estate developer and future President of the United States
Charles King, politician

Technical details
MPAA rating: none
Running time: 118 minutes

See also
Dust to Dust: The Health Effects of 9/11
Juan Gonzalez 	
Jack Newfield

References

External links
 
 Village Voice review
 New York Times, A.O. Scott's May 12, 2006 review of the film
 Variety review
 

2005 films
Documentary films about American politicians
Rudy Giuliani
2000s English-language films
2000s American films